U.S. Route 27 (US 27) in Ohio runs for  between the Kentucky and Indiana state lines:  in Hamilton County and another  in Butler County. The route crosses into Ohio and Downtown Cincinnati via the Taylor–Southgate Bridge over the Ohio River. US 27 follows Mehring Way, Central Avenue, Ezzard Charles Drive and Central Parkway through Downtown Cincinnati. US 27 briefly duplexes with I-75, exiting at I-74 for another brief duplex before exiting onto Colerain Road. US 27 then continues northwest eventually to Oxford, and then reaches the Indiana border another northwest at College Corner.

Route description

Hamilton County 
US 27 enters Ohio on the Taylor–Southgate Bridge over the Ohio River as a four-lane highway. After the bridge ends, the highway makes a loop to the east around a parking structure on Pete Rose Way and Mehring Way, concurrent with US 52. Mehring Way curves towards the west and passes under the Taylor–Southgate Bridge. After the bridge the street parallels the Ohio River and Cincinnati Riverfront Park on the south side of the road, and the U.S. Bank Arena and the Great American Ballpark on the north side. The street passes under the Roebling Bridge, and then passes to the south of Paycor Stadium.

On the southwest corner of the stadium US 27 and US 52 turn north onto Central Avenue. Central Avenue passes on the west side of the stadium.  The route continues north passing the west side of the Duke Energy Convention Center, Cathedral Basilica of St. Peter in Chains, and the Romanesque Cincinnati City Hall.  US 27 then turns east on Ezzard Charles Drive for a block before turning north on Central Parkway, becoming concurrent with US 127.  US 27 leaves Central Parkway at the Hopple Street interchange and then becomes concurrent with Interstate 75 and then Interstate 74 for a short while.

The route then follows Colerain Avenue, ascending through Mount Airy Forest from elevation 490 feet to 930 ft in 2 miles, passing the Cincinnati Water Tanks on North Bend Road.  The remaining stretch in Hamilton County is a quite busy multilane highway that passes through the Mount Airy neighborhood, then exits Cincinnati to briefly pass through the corner of Green Township.  It then becomes the main commercial thoroughfare through Colerain Township, traveling along a broad ridge that roughly separates the watersheds of the Great Miami River to the west from that of West Fork Mill Creek to the east.

The road then splits at an intersection with Strubble Road, with the old alignment of Colerain Avenue branching off, and US 27 following a modern freeway section, passing the "Mount Rumpke" landfill, and descending to and crossing the Great Miami River at elevation 525 feet.

Butler County 
A herringbone brick intersection of Chestnut Street and Patterson Avenue is at the southeast corner of Oxford at U.S. 27. The highway northwest of Oxford is straight and rural being improved 10–15 years ago.  This final section passes to the west of the Oxford Walmart and within a mile of the Butler co. highpoint before reaching College Corner.

History 
The road between Strubble and Oxford was called  the highway to heaven by 1986. There were at times at least 80 crosses along the highway.  After this publicity the road was widened, curves were straightened, and the speed limit was lowered to 45 mph.

Major intersections

References

External links

 Ohio
27
Transportation in Hamilton County, Ohio
Transportation in Butler County, Ohio